Vera Nedkova (16 November 1906 – 7 July 1996) was a Bulgarian modernist painter. A graduate of the Vienna Academy of Fine Arts, she is known as "the grande dame of Bulgarian painting."

Born in Skopje to Bulgarian diplomat Todor Nedkov, Vera and her family immigrated to Sofia after Skopie fell under Serbian control during the Balkan Wars.

In 1923, Nedkova enrolled at the  National Academy of Arts, where she studied painting under renowned professor Nikola Marinov. The following year, she transferred to the Vienna Academy of Fine Arts to continue her studies in painting and restoration, graduating in 1930.

Nedkova relocated to Florence,  where she studied the art of Giotto, Masaccio, and Piero della Francesca, before returning to Bulgaria in 1934, where she would remain until her death in 1996.

From 1946 to 1961, Nedkova worked at the National Archaeological Museum as a restorator and conservator.

References 

20th-century Bulgarian painters
1906 births
1996 deaths